Piotr Iwanicki (born May 15, 1984) is a multiple wheelchair World Latin Champion. Winner of wheelchair dancing World Cup and European Championships. In 2006 Iwanicki has been one of the most accomplished wheelchair dancers in the world. He has won four world championships, two European Championships and seven Polish championships—all between 1999 and 2006. He has also garnered a few World Cup crowns.

Since 2002 he is dancing with able-bodied Dorota Janowska. In June 2006 they were selected as athletes of the month by the International Paralympic Committee. His previous partner was Monika Zawadzka. He represents Poland and dance club Swing-Duet.

Career highlights
2002, 2004-2006 Gold Medal at the IPC Wheelchair Dance World Cup
2005 Gold Medal at the IPC Wheelchair Dance Sport Open European Cup
2002 and 2004 Gold Medal at the IPC Wheelchair Dance World Latin Championships 
2003 Gold Medal at the Wheelchair Dance European Championships
2002-2006 Gold Medal at the Wheelchair Dance International Polish Championships

References
Fancy wheeling, P.G. woman, partner practice for wheelchair dancing event, by Laith Agha, Friday November 8, 2006, Monterey County Herald

External links
Web page of Piotr Iwanicki and Dorota Janowska (in Polish)
Swing Duet web page

Parasports competitors
Polish disabled sportspeople
Polish male dancers
Polish ballroom dancers
Competitive dancers
1984 births
Living people
Place of birth missing (living people)
Dancers with disabilities